A Sport and a Pastime (1967) is a novel by the American writer James Salter.

Summary

Set in France in the early 1960s, the sad and tender story concerns the erotic affair of American middle-class college drop-out Philip Dean and a young French girl, Anne-Marie, as witnessed by a self-consciously unreliable narrator. The unnamed narrator freely admits that much of his observation is in fact his own fantasy of the couple, and includes a number of sexually-explicit descriptions of their day-to-day existence as he imagines it.

Location
Many of the story's events take place in the town of Autun in Burgundy.

Reception
The book is generally regarded by critics as a modern classic. In The New York Times Book Review, novelist and critic Reynolds Price wrote, "Of living novelists, none has produced a novel I admire more than A Sport and a Pastime ... it's as nearly perfect as any American fiction I know." The critic and biographer Adam Begley, in The New York Times Magazine, called it "extraordinary ... The book feels utterly true." After Salter's death in 2015, the novel has continued to receive critical attention. In 2017, Sarah Hall (writing for The Guardian) observed that:

References

1967 American novels
Fiction with unreliable narrators
Novels set in France
Novels set in the 1950s
Novels by James Salter